IOP may refer to:

Organizations
 Institute of Optronics, a Pakistani technical organization
 Institute of Physics, London-based professional association for physicists
 IOP Publishing, its publishing company
 Institute of Physics, Bhubaneswar, an Indian research institute
 Institute of Psychiatry, Psychology and Neuroscience, a school of King's College London, England, previously known as Institute of Psychiatry (IoP)
Institute of Play, an American educational corporation

Science and technology
 UGV Interoperability Profile
 Cromemco IOP, an input/output processor S-100 card
 Intraocular pressure, the fluid pressure inside the eye
 Intensive outpatient program, a rehabilitation therapy

Other uses
 Isle of Palms, South Carolina, US
 IOP, IOC country code for Independent Olympic Participant
 Italian occult psychedelia, a subgenre of Italian psychedelic music

See also
 
 Institute of Physics (disambiguation)
 Institute of Politics (disambiguation)
 IOPS, input/output operations per second